Journal de Bâle et Genève is an independent Swiss online journal published by the media agency Bâle.ch, founded in Basel in 2009. It takes the name from the cities of Basel and Geneva. It covers events in the Grand Genève and the Basel metropolitan area in French language.

References

External links
 Journal de Bâle et Genève

2009 establishments in Switzerland
French-language websites
Magazines published in Switzerland
Mass media in Basel
Mass media in Lausanne
News magazines published in Europe
Swiss news websites
Local interest magazines